Marguerite Casey Foundation is a private, independent grantmaking foundation located in Seattle, Washington. The foundation (originally called Casey Family Grants Program) was created in 2001 by Casey Family Programs. Marguerite Casey Foundation supports leaders, scholars and initiatives focused on shifting the balance of power in society — building power for communities that continue to be excluded from shaping how society works and from sharing in its rewards and freedoms.

History
Jim Casey, the founder of United Parcel Service, established Casey Family Programs in 1966. When UPS went public in 1997, the Casey Programs’ endowment rose from $700 million to over $2 billion.  Casey Family Programs decided to use the new resources to create a new foundation focused on grantmaking. The foundation is named for Jim Casey's sister, Marguerite.

Grantmaking
For the year ended December 31, 2019, Marguerite Casey Foundation reported $804,678,765 in total assets and dispersed $38,982,043 in grants. The foundation makes grants to national organizations and also in four distinct geographic regions: Midwest, South, Southwest, and West. It also funded grants in Washington State from 2004 to 2011, when the Home State Fund was discontinued.

References

External links
 

 Foundations based in the United States
 Organizations based in Seattle